The First Amendment Law Review is a law journal published by students at the University of North Carolina School of Law. it publishes articles related to the First Amendment of the United States Constitution; its goal is the promotion and protection of rights contained in the amendment through scholarly publishing. The journal was established in 2003 and publishes three issues a year. One issue consists of articles from its annual symposium, held in the Fall. The other issues include submitted articles and notes written by staff members and professional scholars.

References

External links

 First Amendment Law Review

American law journals
University of North Carolina at Chapel Hill publications
Publications established in 2003
Biannual journals
English-language journals
Law journals edited by students
Constitutional law journals